High Precision Inc. is an American industrial manufacturing company based in Hamden, Connecticut. It was founded in 1945 by Ermon F. Ayer as a flexible contract manufacturer, and is currently under third generation family ownership and management. The company originally built pipe organs, later branching out into aerospace components, heavy-duty industrial pneumatic tools, torque limiters, and custom CNC machining.

Currently, High Precision Inc. mainly serves the petroleum and chemical refining, plant maintenance, and medical component manufacturing industries.

The company currently occupies a 40,000 square foot manufacturing facility in Hamden, CT.

Products & Services 
 Pneumatic tools
 Torque limiters
 One-way clutches
 CNC machining
 Injection molding
 Precision assembly

External links
 High Precision Inc. - About

Hamden, Connecticut
Manufacturing companies based in Connecticut
Companies based in New Haven County, Connecticut
Pneumatic tool manufacturers
Tool manufacturing companies of the United States